Sebastián Roberto Diana Suárez (born 2 August 1990) is an Uruguayan footballer, who plays for Racing de Montevideo in his homeland.

References
 
 
 Profile at Tenfield Digital 

1990 births
Living people
Uruguayan footballers
Uruguayan expatriate footballers
Association football defenders
Danubio F.C. players
El Tanque Sisley players
Unión Temuco footballers
Deportes Temuco footballers
Santiago Morning footballers
Montevideo City Torque players
Villa Teresa players
Crucero del Norte footballers
Club Almagro players
Racing Club de Montevideo players
Primera B de Chile players
Uruguayan expatriate sportspeople in Chile
Uruguayan expatriate sportspeople in Costa Rica
Uruguayan expatriate sportspeople in Argentina
Expatriate footballers in Chile
Expatriate footballers in Costa Rica
Expatriate footballers in Argentina